The Black Agenda is a Trinidad and Tobago-based radio show hosted by David Muhammad that discusses racial issues in the Caribbean. It is broadcast on 91.9FM from Port of Spain, Trinidad.<ref>Raymond Ramcharitar, "Who Invited Farrakhan?" Trinidad and Tobago Guardian, 21 March 2012.</ref>

 References 

Notes
Muhammad, David. Black Studies'. UWI Press, 2014, p. 7.

Talk radio programs
Mass media in Trinidad and Tobago
2004 radio programme debuts